English Young Liberals is the youth and student wing of the English Liberal Democrats.

English Young Liberals has branches across England including various English universities, and seeks to promote the work and campaigning of Young Liberals as well as the English and Federal party. The wing works to encourage and support young candidates across England, and works with Federal Young Liberals. and the main party to do this.

The English Young Liberals operates as a federation of regional parties, with each having a level of independence, though working within the overall English wing. Regional branches, led by their Chair, are responsible for organising and supporting local branches and societies and co-ordinating activities to recruit and expand membership in their region

Structure 
The English Young Liberals Executive is made up of Directly-elected Chair, Regional Chairs, Vice Chair and four Co-Opted representatives to Federal Young Liberal committees. The current Executive was elected in October 2021 and took office on 1 January 2022.

English Council 
The English Young Liberals also elects six members to send to the English Liberal Democrats English Council, which is the sovereign body of the English Party, in addition to the Chair who attends in their own right.

List of former Chairs

Regions 
Like the English Liberal Democrats, EYL is a federation of eleven regional branches. These branches have their own Chairs, who sit on the EYL Executive, are independent in their organising, events and campaigning. Each region has its own constitution and Executive.

Devon and Cornwall 

There are six members of the Devon and Cornwall Young Liberal Executive - Chair, Campaigns Officer, Events Officer, Finance Officer and two Non Portfolio Officers. All but the Chair are co-opted. A Vice Chair is elected from among members of the Executive.

East Midlands 

The East Midlands Young Liberals cover the counties of Nottinghamshire, Lincolnshire, Leicestershire, Derbyshire, Rutland and Northamptonshire. There are six members of the EMYL Executive - Chair, Finance Officer, Communications Officer, Campaigns Officer, Events Officer and the Chair of the EMYL Women's Network. Members of the East Midlands Constitution are co-opted, except the Chair who is directly elected. Young Liberal members of the East Midlands Lib Dem Executive and Chairs of accredited branches or University societies also attend the Executive.

East of England 

The East of England Young Liberals cover the ceremonial counties of Bedfordshire, Hertfordshire, Norfolk, Suffolk, Essex and Cambridgeshire. There are seven members of the East of England Regional Executive - four regional members and three members at large who are co-opted. The Chair is directly elected. The Chair may give Executive Members portfolios, one of which must be Vice Chair.

London 

The London Young Liberals covers members across Greater London and the City of London. There are seven Executive members, who are co-opted, in addition to a directly elected Chair. The Chair may give Executive Members portfolios, one of which must be Vice Chair.

North East 

The North East Executive is the oldest constituted Executive in the English Young Liberals. There are four Executive members, who are appointed by a directly elected Chair. The Chair may give Executive Members portfolios, one of which must be Deputy Chair. Additionally, there is one Honorary President.

North West 

The North West Young Liberals cover the areas of Greater Manchester, Merseyside, Cheshire, Cumbria and Lancashire. In addition to the directly elected Chair, there are two additional Executive members: Campaigns Officer and Non-portfolio Officer.

South Central 

The South Central Young Liberals represent Young Liberal members in Hampshire, the Isle of Wight, Berkshire, Oxfordshire and Buckinghamshire. In addition to the directly elected Chair and the a Vice Chair elected by and from other Executive members, there is one ordinary executive member for each county, a Vice Chair and four diversity representatives who are elected by the regional annual general meeting. A representative from each Young Liberals branch in the region are also ex-officio members of the regional executive.

South East 

The South East Young Liberals represent the areas of East Sussex, West Sussex, Kent and Surrey. With the exception of the directly elected Chair, all seven members - one from each county and three at large - of the South East Regional Executive are co-opted. The Chair may give Executive Members portfolios, one of which must be Vice Chair. The chair of each affiliated branch or university society are full voting members of the Executive, but may not hold portfolios.

Western Counties 

The Western Counties Young Liberals represent Wiltshire, West of England Combined Authority, Dorset, Gloucestershire and Somerset.

West Midlands 

The West Midlands Young Liberals represent the West Midlands region, including the West Midlands Combined Authority, Herefordshire, Shropshire, Staffordshire, Warwickshire, and Worcestershire. The region includes branches at the University of Birmingham, the University of Warwick, Keele University, Telford and Wrekin, and Aston University. Members of the Executive are elected at the West Midlands Regional Annual General Meeting, with the exception of the Chair, who is elected alongside federal elections.

Yorkshire and the Humber 

Members of the Yorkshire and the Humber Regional Executive are co-opted. There are no fixed executive positions in Yorkshire and the Humber, with the Chair deciding the makeup and nature of the executive based on their need.

See also

 Young Liberals - UK federal level
 Scottish Young Liberals – Scottish wing of Young Liberals
 Welsh Young Liberals – Welsh wing of Young Liberals

References

External links

 Young Liberals
 English Young Liberals official Facebook page

Organisation of the Liberal Democrats (UK)
Youth wings of political parties in the United Kingdom
Youth wings of liberal parties